This is a list of members of the Tasmanian House of Assembly between the 30 April 1912 election and the 23 January 1913 election.

The term was shortened due to instability within the newly formed Liberal Party.

Sources
 
 Parliament of Tasmania (2006). The Parliament of Tasmania from 1856

Members of Tasmanian parliaments by term
20th-century Australian politicians